Medina Township is one of twelve townships in Warren County, Indiana, United States. According to the 2010 census, its population was 457 and it contained 191 housing units.

History
Medina Township was one of the original four created when the county was organized in 1827.

Geography
It contains one town, Green Hill, which is in the southeast part of the township. The stream of Armstrong Creek runs through this township.

Cemeteries
The township contains Armstrong Chapel Cemetery, Davis Cemetery, and Pond Grove Cemetery.

Transportation
Indiana State Road 26 runs across the north part of the township from west to east, connecting Pine Village (in neighboring Adams Township to the west) with Lafayette to the east.

Education
Medina Township is part of the Benton Community School Corporation

Government
Medina Township has a trustee who administers rural fire protection and ambulance service, provides relief to the poor, manages cemetery care, and performs farm assessment, among other duties. The trustee is assisted in these duties by a three-member township board. The trustees and board members are elected to four-year terms.

Medina Township is part of Indiana's 8th congressional district, Indiana House of Representatives District 26, and Indiana State Senate District 38.

References

 
 United States Census Bureau TIGER/Line Shapefiles

Bibliography

External links

Townships in Warren County, Indiana
1827 establishments in Indiana
Populated places established in 1827
Townships in Indiana